Antiscopa epicomia is a moth in the family Crambidae. It was described by Edward Meyrick in 1884 from specimens obtained near Arthur's Pass and Dunedin. It is endemic to New Zealand.

The wingspan is 18–19 mm. The forewings are pale light ochreous grey, but the basal third is reddish-ochreous brown. The hindwings are pale whitish grey with a light grey lunule, postmedian line and submarginal band. Adults have been recorded on wing in January.

References

Moths described in 1884
Scopariinae
Moths of New Zealand
Taxa named by Edward Meyrick
Endemic fauna of New Zealand
Endemic moths of New Zealand